Lauren Butler (born 20 November 2000) is an Australian rules footballer playing for Collingwood in the AFL Women's (AFLW).

Early life and junior career 
Butler is from Maryborough, Victoria and attended Ballarat Grammar School. She played football from the age of eight, representing the Carisbrook Lady Redbacks as a junior. In 2017, Butler captained her school to victory in the interschool Herald Sun Shield competition. She also captained the Greater Western Victoria Rebels for 2018 in the TAC Cup Girls and played two games for the Western Bulldogs in the VFL Women's before breaking her finger. Butler represented Vic Country at the 2018 AFL Women's Under 18 Championships and tested at the AFLW draft combine, placing fourth in the yo-yo test and fifth in the two-kilometre time trial.

AFLW career 
Butler was drafted by Collingwood with pick 18 in the 2018 AFLW draft, their fourth selection. She made her debut in the opening round of the 2019 AFLW season versus . It was revealed Butler had signed on with Collingwood for two years on 10 June 2021.

Statistics
Statistics are correct the end of the S7 (2022) season.

|- 
! scope="row" style="text-align:center" | 2019
|style="text-align:center;"|
| 23 || 3 || 0 || 0 || 4 || 5 || 9 || 1 || 8 || 0.0 || 0.0 || 1.3 || 1.7 || 3.0 || 0.3 || 2.7
|- 
! scope="row" style="text-align:center" | 2020
|style="text-align:center;"|
| 23 || 7 || 0 || 0 || 42 || 22 || 64 || 17 || 15 || 0.0 || 0.0 || 6.0 || 3.1 || 9.1 || 2.4 || 2.1
|- 
! scope="row" style="text-align:center" | 2021
|style="text-align:center;"|
| 23 || 7 || 0 || 0 || 38 || 32 || 70 || 12 || 19 || 0.0 || 0.0 || 5.4 || 4.6 || 10.0 || 1.7 || 2.7
|- 
! scope="row" style="text-align:center" | 2022
|style="text-align:center;"|
| 23 || 11 || 0 || 0 || 88 || 55 || 143 || 25 || 34 || 0.0 || 0.0 || 8.0 || 5.0 || 13.0 || 2.3 || 3.1
|- 
! scope="row" style="text-align:center" | S7 (2022)
|style="text-align:center;"|
| 23 || 12 || 1 || 0 || 119 || 46 || 165 || 32 || 40 || 0.1 || 0.0 || 9.9 || 3.8 || 13.8 || 2.7 || 3.3
|- class="sortbottom"
! colspan=3| Career
! 40
! 1
! 0
! 291
! 160
! 451
! 87
! 116
! 0.03
! 0.0
! 7.3
! 4.0
! 11.3
! 2.2
! 2.9
|}

References

External links 

2000 births
Living people
People from Maryborough, Victoria
People educated at Ballarat Grammar School
Australian rules footballers from Victoria (Australia)
Greater Western Victoria Rebels players (NAB League Girls)
Collingwood Football Club (AFLW) players